ECOWEEK Εβδομάδα Οικολογίας (Greek) and אקוויק שנה הרגלים שנה אקלים (Hebrew) is a private, non-profit initiative to change people's habits and with the mission to raise environmental awareness and awareness on climate change and to promote the principles of sustainability. 

ECOWEEK organizes platforms of activity towards the empowerment, networking, education and training of young professionals and students. They include architects, designers, engineers, landscape architects, industrial designers, visual communication designers. Through workshops and other activities, they engage in innovative, sustainable, urban, and public interventions and placemaking, in cooperation with local authorities, organizations, academic and research institutions, and leaders.

Mission 
ECOWEEK's mission is to raise environmental and climate change awareness and to promote the principles of sustainability.

History 
ECOWEEK was first established in Aegina, Greece in 2005, as a community event – Ecological Week in Aegina – to raise environmental awareness of the local community of 14,000. At the time Aegina was challenged by unresolved waste management, illegal burning of waste, inexistent waste recycling program, water shortages, energy shortages, and a partially unregulated, speculative construction market for summer houses. These factors put pressure on protected areas to be developed and constructed. Summer home construction also contributed to the illegal disposal of construction waste in natural preserves and increased prussure on the capacity of the existing infrastructure of the island.

In 2007, responding to an increase demand for environmental awareness beyond Aegina, ECOWEEK co-organized activity throughout Greece, and initiated free-admission screenings of award-winning documentary on climate change by Davis Guggenheim, An Inconvenient Truth with Al Gore, in schools, army bases, and public fora in Athens, Thessaloniki, Patras, Lamia, Corfu, and Crete. Within this activity, in June 2007, ECOWEEK held a public free-admission keynote lecture and slide show on climate change with Al Gore at the Athens Concert Hall. In 2007 ECOWEEK was also established in Jerusalem, Israel and in 2008 ECOWEEK initiated the first Ecological Week in Larnaca, Cyprus, in cooperation with the Municipality of Larnaka, involving schools, universities, professional organizations, and the general public.

Programs 
Since 2005, ECOWEEK developed its outreach activity towards raising awareness to a variety of population groups, age-groups and interests. For example, from children activity, cleaning of beaches, lottery of composters and solar chargers, to academic and colloquial lectures, site visits, design workshops, and film screenings.

Since 2008, ECOWEEK activities focus more on sustainable design and ecological building, social design, and placemaking. Its activity involved primarily one-week-long design workshops and international conferences for young and established professionals – primarily architects, designers, landscape architects and engineers. ECOWEEK has developed and expanded its activity through close collaboration with cultural institutions, such as the American Institute of Architects Continental Europe, the British Council, Goethe Institute, academic institutions, municipalities and governments. ECOWEEK has initiated and organized activities in Ag. Nikolaos (Crete), Athens, Azaryia (Bethany), Belgrade, Bucharest, Cairns, Copenhagen, Istanbul, Jerusalem, Kraków, London, Milano, Mumbai, Sarajevo, Tel Aviv, Thessaloniki, Tilburg, Prishtina, and Rome.

In 2017 ECOWEEK published its first book titled ECOWEEK Book#1: 50 Voices for Sustainability, featuring fifty articles by leading architects, designers, professionals, academics and environmentalists from around the world. Among them award-winning architects Kengo Kuma, BIG, MVRDV, Francoise-Helene Jourda, Diebedo Francis Kere, Michael Sorkin, Prof. David Orr and Antarctica explorer Robert Swan. The same year ECOWEEK also issued ECOWEEK: The Workshops a publication with a collection of ideas and projects from the ECOWEEK workshops (2009-2016).

In 2021 ECOWEEK published its second book titled ECOWEEK Book#2: 15 Paths to Sustainability: from Innovation to Social Design, featuring articles by leading architects and designers on sustainbable design, innovation, circular design, social and participatory design and public participation. The same year ECOWEEK also issued ECOWEEK Workshops (2009-2021) a publication with a collection of ideas and projects from the ECOWEEK workshops in 17 countries.

Hassan Fathy 
In 1989 ECOWEEK co-founder architect Elias Messinas met the late Egyptian architect Hassan Fathy – author of Architecture for the Poor – in Cairo. In that meeting, Fathy conveyed to Elias how problems in Egypt – among them housing for the poor – could be solved. Among others Fathy challenged Messinas when he emphasized the need for young professionals to be more aware of their own community and instead of imitating architecture in international magazines, to reach out, learn about and be creative while benefiting with their work their own community.

Inspired by Fathy, ECOWEEK workshops have gradually developed a more hands-on approach that links between academia and the community, and between professionals and students since 2010. Aiming to both empower and train young professionals to address urban public space, placemaking, urban communities through interventions in design and hands-on workshops in urban public context, ECOWEEK and its partners have developed a model of close collaboration with local authorities, local organizations and leaders. Through this collaboration, the ECOWEEK workshops are assigned projects that are real, support them with professional consultants and see that some of the projects are implemented. Students' ideas are heard and cities, neighborhoods and communities benefit from the innovative and creative ideas of students and the professional guidance of the workshop leaders. The ECOWEEK workshops have developed sustainable proposals for Copenhagen, Thessaloniki, Rome, Belgrade, Kraków, Jerusalem, and Azaryia, and placamaking interventions at the Neot Shoshanim community center in Holon.

The GREENHOUSE 

Aiming to establish a permanent platform and not just one-week-long activity, ECOWEEK established the GREENHOUSE in 2011 in Athens, Greece. The GREENHOUSE is a platform for innovation and entrepreneurship for society and the environment, engaging young architects, designers, landscape architects and students in real design assignments for real non-profit organizations and local authorities. The GREENHOUSE teams, under the guidance of experienced professionals, have developed sustainable solutions for schools, community centers, welfare institutions and the urban public space in Athens and Thessaloniki in Greece and Holon, Bat Yam and Jaffa in Israel.

Online Challenge 
Answering the COVID-19 challenge of travel restrictions and confinement, and seeing the opportunity to raise the environmental agenda through virtual platforms, ECOWEEK has initiated a series of online challenge events, to engage young professionals and students worldwide. The first such event took place in May 2020 attracting more than 350 participants from 20 countries. The second took place in October 2020. More online events took place in Rome  and Greece  in 2021.

References

External links 
 

Non-profit organizations based in Greece
Architectural design
Architectural education
Sustainable development
Environmental design
Environmental organizations based in Greece
Climate change organizations